Eusebio "El Corcho" Hernández Munilla (26 June 1911 – 21 June 1997) was a Chilean basketball player. He competed in the 1936 Summer Olympics.

References

External links

1911 births
1997 deaths
Chilean men's basketball players
Olympic basketball players of Chile
Basketball players at the 1936 Summer Olympics
Sportspeople from Valparaíso
20th-century Chilean people